Moses Coates Jr. Farm, also known as Meadow Brook Farm, is a historic home and farm located in Schuylkill Township, Chester County, Pennsylvania. The house is a -story, ell-shaped, stuccoed stone structure with a gable roof.  The oldest section dates to about 1754, as a two-story, six-bay two room over two room house in the Georgian style.  About 1800, a three-bay section was added. An addition expansion was in 1896, and the house reconstructed in 1933 for use as a clubhouse, at which time the property was converted to a 9-hole golf course. Also on the property are a contributing bank barn, carriage house, and two spring houses.  During the American Revolution the house served as officer's quarters for American officers in late-1777 and early-1778 during the encampment at Valley Forge.

It was listed on the National Register of Historic Places in 1984.

References

Houses completed in 1754
Houses on the National Register of Historic Places in Pennsylvania
Georgian architecture in Pennsylvania
Houses in Chester County, Pennsylvania
1754 establishments in Pennsylvania
National Register of Historic Places in Chester County, Pennsylvania